The list of mammals of Vermont includes all mammal species living in the US state of Vermont. Three species including the eastern cottontail, house mouse, and the Norway rat have been introduced into the state. Four species of mammals are currently extirpated from the state: elk, gray wolf, wolverine, and caribou. Vermont does not have a designated state mammal, but does designate the Morgan horse as its state horse. The list does not include species found only in captivity.

Didelphimorphia

Opossums
Family: Didelphidae
Virginia opossum, Didelphis virginiana

Eulipotyphla

Shrews
Family: Soricidae
Eastern water shrew, Sorex albibarbis
Cinereus shrew, Sorex cinereus
Long-tailed shrew, Sorex dispar
Smoky shrew, Sorex fumeus 
American pygmy shrew, Sorex hoyi

Moles
Family: Talpidae
Star-nosed mole, Condylura cristata 
Hairy-tailed mole, Parascalops breweri

Rodents

Beavers
Family: Castoridae
North American beaver, Castor canadensis

Porcupines
Family: Erethizontidae
North American porcupine, Erethizon dorsatum

Jumping mice
Family: Dipodidae
Woodland jumping mouse, Napaeozapus insignis 
Meadow jumping mouse, Zapus hudsonius

New World rats, mice, and voles
Family: Cricetidae
Southern red-backed vole, Clethrionomys gapperi
Rock vole, Microtus chrotorrhinus
Eastern meadow vole, Microtus pennsylvanicus
Woodland vole, Microtus pinetorum
Muskrat, Ondatra zibethicus
White-footed mouse, Peromyscus leucopus 
Eastern deer mouse, Peromyscus maniculatus
Southern bog lemming, Synaptomys cooperi

Old World rats, mice
Family: Muridae
 House mouse, Mus musculus introduced
 Norway rat, Rattus norvegicus introduced

Chipmunks, marmots, squirrels
Family: Sciuridae
Northern flying squirrel, Glaucomys sabrinus
Southern flying squirrel, Glaucomys volans
Groundhog, Marmota monax  
Eastern gray squirrel, Sciurus carolinensis
Eastern chipmunk, Tamias striatus
American red squirrel, Tamiasciurus hudsonicus

Lagomorpha

Hares and rabbits
Family: Leporidae
Snowshoe hare, Lepus americanus
Eastern cottontail, Sylvilagus floridanus introduced
New England cottontail, Sylvilagus transitionalis

Chiroptera

Vesper bats
Family: Vespertilionidae
Big brown bat, Eptesicus fuscus 
Silver-haired bat, Lasionycteris noctivagans
Eastern red bat, Lasiurus borealis
Hoary bat, Lasiurus cinereus
Eastern small-footed myotis, Myotis leibii
Little brown bat, Myotis lucifugus
Northern long-eared bat, Myotis septentrionalis 
Indiana bat, Myotis sodalis
Tricolored bat, Perimyotis subflavus

Carnivora

Cats
Family: Felidae
Canada lynx, Lynx canadensis 
Bobcat, Lynx rufus
Cougar, Puma concolor possibly extirpated
Eastern cougar, P. c. couguar

Canines
Family: Canidae
Coyote, Canis latrans
Gray wolf, Canis lupus extirpated
Gray fox, Urocyon cinereoargenteus
Red fox, Vulpes vulpes

Bears
Family: Ursidae
American black bear, Ursus americanus

Skunks
Family: Mephitidae
Striped skunk, Mephitis mephitis

Weasels
Family: Mustelidae
Wolverine, Gulo gulo extirpated
North American river otter, Lontra canadensis
American marten, Martes americana
American ermine, Mustela richardsonii
Long-tailed weasel, Neogale frenata
American mink, Neogale vison
Fisher, Pekania pennanti

Raccoons
Family: Procyonidae
Raccoon, Procyon lotor

Artiodactyla

Deer
Family: Cervidae
Moose, Alces alces
Elk, Cervus canadensis extirpated
White-tailed deer, Odocoileus virginianus
Caribou, Rangifer tarandus extirpated

See also
Mammals of New England
List of birds of Vermont
List of regional mammals lists
List of prehistoric mammals
Mammal classification

References

Vermont
mammals